The 2017 Junior Women's Softball World Championship was an international softball competition held in Clearwater, Florida from July 24 to 30, 2017. It was the 12th edition of the tournament.

Participating teams 
A total of 26 national youth teams competed in the tournament.

Group stage

Group A

Group B

Group C

Group D

17th–26th place classification

Round 1

Round 2

Round 3

17th place match

9th–16th place classification
In this round, the eight teams will play a Page playoff. The teams placed 3rd in the Group stage will play the Major quarterfinals; the teams placed 4th in the Group stage will play the Minor quarterfinals. The winners of the Minor QFs will play in the Classification round against the losers of the Major QFs.

Minor quarterfinals

Major quarterfinals

Classification round

Major semifinal

Minor semifinal

Preliminary final

Grand final

Championship round
In this round, the eight teams will play a Page playoff. The teams placed 1st in the Group stage will play the Major quarterfinals; the teams placed 2nd in the Group stage will play the Minor quarterfinals. The winners of the Minor QFs will play in the Classification round against the losers of the Major QFs.

Minor quarterfinals

Major quarterfinals

Classification round

Major semifinal

Minor semifinal

Preliminary final

Grand final

Final standings

References

Junior Women's
Softball
Junior Women's Softball
Sports in Clearwater, Florida